Gaoage Oageng Saliva Molapisi, sometimes also known as Oagile Saliva Molapisi, is a South African politician who is currently serving as the North West's Member of the Executive Council (MEC) for Public Works and Roads since December 2018. He previously served as MEC for Community Safety and Transport Management from 2014 to 2016, before spending two years as an ordinary Member of the North West Provincial Legislature from 2016 to 2018. He is a member of the African National Congress (ANC).

Molapisi is from the region that, in the post-apartheid era, became the Dr Kenneth Kaunda District Municipality. He was first appointed to the North West Executive Council after the May 2014 general election, in which he was ranked 22nd on the ANC's party list; newly elected Premier Supra Mahumapelo appointed him MEC for Community Safety and Transport Management. However, less than two years later, on 8 May 2016, Mahumapelo fired him. He remained an ordinary Member of the North West Provincial Legislature.

He returned to the Executive Council under Mahumapelo's successor, Job Mokgoro, who appointed him MEC for Department of Public Works and Roads in a reshuffle announced on 6 December 2018. After the 2019 general election, in which Molapisi was ranked 19th on the ANC's party list, Mokgoro reappointed him to the same portfolio in his new Executive Council. In August 2022, Molapisi was elected to the Provincial Executive Committee of the ANC's branch in the North West.

References

External links 

 Gaoage Saliva Molapisi at South African Government
 

Living people
African National Congress politicians
Members of the North West Provincial Legislature
21st-century South African politicians
Year of birth missing (living people)